Cantharidus sendersi is a species of sea snail, a marine gastropod mollusk in the family Trochidae, the top snails.

Description
The length of the shell varies between 3 mm and 5.1 mm.

Distribution
This species occurs in the Pacific Ocean off the Philippines and French Polynesia.

References

External links
 

sendersi
Gastropods described in 2006